The Central European Defence Cooperation (CEDC) is a military collaboration consisting of the Central European states of Austria, the Czech Republic, Slovakia, Hungary, Slovenia and Croatia. Poland has an observer status in this cooperative framework.

The joint objective is enhancing the defence co-operation, including the pooling and sharing of defence capabilities of the member countries and organizing common training and exercises.
Since the European migrant crisis of 2015-2016 the cooperation has focused on handling mass migration too.

The CEDC was created in 2010. 
All members are also members of European Union and all except Austria are in NATO. The presidency rotates yearly. As of 2022, the presidency is held by Austria.

The CEDC geo-political borders are more or less the same borders of the former Habsburg monarchy, and its successors, the Austrian Empire and Austria-Hungary. Territory of participating states is 381,682 km2 while the territory of the Austrian Empire in 1804 was	698,700 km2.

History 
Formation of the group started in late 2010, the first meeting of defence ministers took place in June 2012 in Frauenkirchen, Austria.

From March 31 to April 1, 2016, a conference of defense ministers from the CEDC member states as well as those from Poland, Serbia, North Macedonia and Montenegro took place in Vienna. The central theme was the European migrant crisis. Germany and Greece were also invited but did not participate. A joint initiative was taken to secure the external border, a continued closure of the Balkan route and the implementation of settlement measures of migrants who had arrived previously.

On 19 June 2017 the six countries pledged in Prague closer cooperation on tackling illegal migration including the use of armed forces. Among the group's goals is that all migrants who want to apply for asylum in any EU country must do so from out side the bloc.
Countries are working on the joint action plan, which will distribute tasks between member's armies, police forces and other organisations when common response is needed.

In September 2017 the group organized a joint military exercise Cooperative Security 2017 (COOPSEC17) in Allentsteig, Austria focused on fortifying borders against mass migration.

See also 
 Visegrád Group
 EU Med Group
 Craiova Group
 Central European Initiative
 Nordic Defence Cooperation
 Three Seas Initiative
 Salzburg Forum
 Common Security and Defence Policy

References

External links 
 Djordjevic attends CEDC meeting 
 Minister Buljević attends CEDC meeting 

Intergovernmental organizations
Foreign relations of Austria
Foreign relations of Croatia
Foreign relations of the Czech Republic
Foreign relations of Hungary
Foreign relations of Poland
Foreign relations of Slovakia
Foreign relations of Slovenia
Central Europe
Austria–Hungary relations
Austria–Croatia relations
Croatia–Czech Republic relations
Czechoslovakia–Poland relations
Czech Republic–Poland relations
Czechoslovakia–Hungary relations
Poland–Slovakia relations
2010 in Europe
21st-century military alliances
European integration
Central European intergovernmental organizations
Military of Austria
Military of Croatia
Military of the Czech Republic
Military of Hungary
Military of Slovakia
Military of Slovenia
Bottom-up regional groups within the European Union